The 1992 Montana gubernatorial election took place on November 3, 1992. Incumbent Governor of Montana Stan Stephens, who was first elected in 1988, declined to seek re-election. Marc Racicot, the Attorney General of Montana, won the Republican primary and advanced to the general election, where he faced State Representative Dorothy Bradley, who had emerged from a crowded Democratic primary as the nominee of her party. A close election ensued, but in the end, Racicot ended up defeating Bradley to win his first of two terms as governor.

Democratic primary

Candidates
 Dorothy Bradley, State Representative
 Mike McGrath, Lewis and Clark County Attorney
 Frank B. Morrison, Jr., former Montana Supreme Court Associate Justice
 Bob Kelleher, perennial candidate
 Martin J. "Red" Beckman
 Curly Thornton

Results

Republican primary

Candidates
 Marc Racicot, Attorney General of Montana
 Andrea Bennett, Montana State Auditor

Results

General election

Results

County results

Source

References

Montana
Gubernatorial
1992